Frankie Jay Sutherland (born 6 December 1993) is a professional footballer who plays as a midfielder for Southern League Premier Division South side Chesham United. A QPR academy graduate, Sutherland has also spent time on loan at Portsmouth, and has represented the Republic of Ireland at youth level.

Club career
Born in Hillingdon, London, Sutherland is a product of Queens Park Rangers youth system in 2005, aged 11. In 2012 summer, he was promoted to the first team, receiving the no. 30 jersey. He also signed a new two-year contract with the London club, running until June 2015. In July 2013, Sutherland featured with QPR's first team in friendly matches against Beşiktaş, Southend United and Udinese, scoring a goal against the Italian giants.

In November, he was expected to join Portsmouth in a loan deal, but the move failed. On 15 January 2013, he joined Pompey in a one-month loan deal. On 24 February, he made his professional début, replacing Adam Reed in the 63rd minute of a 1–3 home defeat against Hartlepool. On 11 February, Sutherland returned to QPR, after just making one appearance for Pompey.

On 21 October 2013, Sutherland joined Leyton Orient in a one-month loan deal. He made his debut for Orient on 9 November in the 5–2 win at home to Southport in the first round of the FA Cup, but was stretchered off during the first half with an anterior cruciate ligament injury. He subsequently returned to QPR to begin a recovery estimated to take six to nine months.

On 30 October 2014, Sutherland joined AFC Wimbledon on an initial one-month loan deal. On 27 November 2014, Sutherland's loan deal at AFC Wimbledon was extended until 6 January 2015.

On 9 October 2015, Sutherland joined League Two side Dagenham & Redbridge on a 28-day loan.

On 30 September 2016, Sutherland joined National League side Woking, before being released and then signing for Brighton-based National League South side Whitehawk in January 2017.

On 4 August 2017, a day before the commencement of the National League season, it was announced that Sutherland had joined Bromley after a successful trial period.

Following spells with Ebbsfleet United and Billericay Town, Sutherland joined Southern League side, Farnborough on 13 November 2021. The season ended in promotion for Farnborough with victory over Hayes & Yeading United in the play-off final.

In August 2022, Sutherland returned to the Southern League Premier Division South to sign for Chesham United.

International career
Sutherland represented Republic of Ireland under-17's, qualifying through his Donegal-born grandmother, making his debut on 1 September 2009, in a Syrianka International Cup match against Russia, getting on the scoresheet. He then played another two matches, with Ireland being knocked out in the group stage. He also appeared on 2010 EURO U17 Qualifying and Elite rounds, scoring against Bulgaria.

Sutherland also played for Republic of Ireland under-19's, making his debut on 26 May 2012, against Portugal. He also played against Ukraine and Israel, with Ireland finished third in the group.

On 23 January 2013, he was called up to the Republic of Ireland under-21 squad.

Career statistics

Honours
Bromley
FA Trophy runner-up: 2017–18

References

External links

QPR official profile
Republic of Ireland profile at Soccer Scene

1993 births
Living people
Footballers from Hillingdon
Republic of Ireland association footballers
Association football midfielders
Queens Park Rangers F.C. players
Portsmouth F.C. players
Leyton Orient F.C. players
AFC Wimbledon players
Dagenham & Redbridge F.C. players
Crawley Town F.C. players
Woking F.C. players
Whitehawk F.C. players
Ebbsfleet United F.C. players
Billericay Town F.C. players
Farnborough F.C. players
Chesham United F.C. players
English Football League players
National League (English football) players
Southern Football League players
Republic of Ireland youth international footballers
Republic of Ireland under-21 international footballers